The Tinnakill Duanaire (Trinity College Dublin MS 1340) is an early seventeenth-century manuscript "prized for its important collection of bardic religious verse". It is believed to have been compiled for Aodh Buidhe Mac Domhnaill (1546–1619) of Tinnakill, County Laois, Leinster, who is the subject of one of its poems, along with his brother, Alasdar (d. 1577). The poem concerning Aodh Buidhe — "Le dís cuirthear clú Laighean" — is thought to have been composed about 1570 by Muircheartach Ó Cobhthaigh.

References

Anne Sullivan, The Tinnakill dunaire, in: Celtica; 11, (1976), pp. 214–28.
Eoghan Ó Raghallaigh, "A poem to Aodh Buidhe and Alasdar Mac Domhnaill of Tinnakill", in: Ossory, Laois and Leinster; 2 (2006)

1620s books
17th-century manuscripts
Irish-language literature
Irish literature
Irish manuscripts
Irish texts
Medieval literature
Library of Trinity College Dublin